The U-Bahn Line B is the second line in the network of the Frankfurt U-Bahn. It leads in west–east direction from the central railway station (Hauptbahnhof) over the old town to Konstablerwache, where it splits into two branches to Bornheim (U4 service) and Preungesheim (U5 service). Originally planned as an independent main line, the D line represents an extension of the U4 to Bockenheimer Warte from the central railway station.

The northern branch to Preungesheim was opened in 1974 and was used by the B1 service, and since May 1978 by U5. A large part of the route consists of a former tram line, which runs in Eckenheimer highway on street-level railway track. The platforms were also very low on the parts of the track, meaning that only the converted Ptb trams could run on the line. From 2013 to 2016, the above ground stations were developed barrier-free. Since 9 October 2016 the subway cars type U5 run on the U5 service.

Inaugurated in 1980, the U4 runs between Bockenheim and Bornheim exclusively on independent railway tracks and in tunnels. In 2008, the line was extended beyond the existing terminus Seckbacher road on existing tracks by the depot East to Schäfflestraße in the district Riederwald and drove for the first time also partially above ground. In December 2008, this trial operation went into regular operation, with the line extended to Enkheim. Every second to third train of the U4 goes there on a special track in the course of the Borsigallee, the existing above-ground tracks of the C line together with the U7 service. Since then, the U4, like the other Frankfurt underground services, has not been independent of individual traffic on the entire route.

List of sections

The B-line can be divided into three sections: in the common line used by the U4 and U5 between the main train station and Konstablerwache and in two route branches, in which the trunk line branches out at the Konstablerwache. Shortly after this central station leaves the U5 Scheffeleck the B-line and the tunnel, while the U4 continues in the direction of Bornheim. The densely built downtown area is not left. Until the former final stop Seckbacher Landstraße the route runs completely underground. Thus, the trains of the U4, which turn at this station, are the only exclusively subterranean moving light rail in Frankfurt.

The U4 also travels parts of the C and D line: It does not end like the U5 at the central railway station, but drives in addition as the only Stadtbahn line the stations Festhalle / Messe and Bockenheimer Warte the D-line. This almost two-kilometer long piece is the (after the opening of the Riedberg clasp of the U8 and U9 (2010)) the second youngest section in the subway network, opened in 2001. The U4 has also been extended at the other end of the B line: since December 14, 2008, some of their trains have entered part of the C line via the depot of the East depot until the final stop at Enkheim on the U7. (As a test, the service had already been extended from June to December 2008 to Schäfflestraße station.)

Officially, the B-line is divided into sections as follows. These are usually numbered with Roman numerals; however, connecting lines use Arabic numbers:

The main section
Below the station forecourt and the subterranean shopping arcade below there is the four-track underground station Hauptbahnhof, which was built as a community station for the B and D lines. It has two middle platforms, which are to be driven according to long-term planning from the north–south line D and the east–west line B in the direction of operation. At present, however, only the eastern branch of the B line and the northern branch of the D line exist, which are therefore continuously used by the U4 until further notice. The U4 to Bockenheim and the terminating U5 use the inner track of the station. Starting at the Hauptbahnhof the U5 runs since the commissioning of the extension of the U4 to Bockenheimer waiting in the direction Preungesheim the other inner track, the outer western track is used by the U4 to Bornheim. The eastern outer track is intended for the previously unrealized southern D line and since the opening of the station out of service. At the central station, the most important regional transport hub in the region, there is a transition to the suburban S-Bahn, whose tunnel station is below the subway station, tram, city and regional buses as well as regional and long-distance traffic.

The track tunnel joins the station south of the station and first describes a left turn under one block of the station area, finally entering the course of Gutleutstraße. In its course, the route reaches the subway station Willy-Brandt-Platz. This was in 1974 the first transfer station in the Frankfurt subway network. The station of the B-line lies below that of the A-line, both stations have Seitenbahnsteige. The station is located in the Frankfurt financial district on the New Mainzer Straße, the Eurotower of the European Central Bank has a direct access, but the management of the ECB has let close. On the Willy Brandt Square itself stands the Frankfurt Opera, which shares a building with the Schauspielhaus.

The route continues through the former Old Town of Frankfurt, first through the Weißfrauenstraße, then through the Münzgasse and through the Limpurgergasse at the Römer to finally reach the Römerberg, the central square of the old town. At the height of the historic garden, the excavated foundations of the Franconian royal palace, the subway station Dom / Römer joins deep below the oldest Frankfurt settlement ground. It has a central platform, a spreader decorated with spoils of the 1944 destroyed Old Town distribution level and probably the longest escalators of Frankfurt's rapid transit stations that lead to the eastern exit at the foot of the western tower of the Imperial Cathedral. North of this exit lay the same time built Technical City Hall, which has since been demolished, however, to reconstruct parts of Frankfurt's old town at this point.

Beyond the station, the underground runs under the cathedral square and runs through the Kannengießergasse to the Fahrgasse, which crosses it and then swings in a wide arc under two blocks and the Dominican monastery in a northerly direction. In the course of the wide Kurt Schumacher Street she finally reaches the Konstablerwache. This large, named after a former police station on the square Zeil is one of the most important points of the Frankfurt shopping city and due to its poor urban planning design for decades has been the subject of numerous new planning. Below the square, which is designated as a pedestrian area, there is a large underground rapid-transit railway node. In the second basement there is the three-track station of the B-line, transverse to this, the four-track community station of the C-line and the S-Bahn, at both middle platforms S and U hold each at the same platform. Trains on the B line use two tracks in the direction of the central railway station, because here the branches from Bornheim (U4) and Preungesheim (U5) meet. In the opposite direction both services use the same track, the track tunnel branches only after leaving the station.

U4

The U4 is a service on the Frankfurt U-Bahn. At the time of the services's inauguration in 1980, it ran from the central railway station to the Konstablerwache and then continued along the Berger Straße all the way up to Seckbacher Landstraße in Bornheim, making it the first service to run entirely underground over its total length. In 2001, the U4 was extended from the central railway station to Bockenheimer Warte, with an additional stop at the Frankfurt Trade Fair along the way. In 2008, some of the trains started continuing past Seckbacher Landstraße to Schäfflestraße and then overground to Enkheim together with the U7.

Here, the subway first reaches the district Nordend and the Berger road. Berger Straße is a popular shopping street and an important destination in a Wilhelminian residential district with many cafés and pubs. Due to the narrow road cross section of the Berger road, the two tunnels were built here for the first time in Frankfurt not next to each other, but one above the other. Accordingly, the three stations in this street consist of two superimposed single-track stations.

The first of these stations is the subway station Merianplatz under the square of the same name, the center of the lower Berger street. In the middle of the square is the Merianbad, not a swimming pool, but a former public bathhouse for citizens who did not have their own bathroom.

The underground follows the course of the Berger road to the intersection Höhenstraße, a section of the avenue ring. Underneath the intersection is the U-Bahn station Höhenstraße, from where you can change to the city bus route 32, which runs via the Alleenring. The Höhenstraße separates the southern, belonging to the north end of the Berger road from the northern, Bornheimer section.

In the following section of the Berger Straße are some important facilities, such as the Catholic Josefskirche, just a few steps away from the Bürgerhaus Bornheim and the Berger Kino, one of the oldest theaters in the city. Between the intersection with the Wiesen-, Mainkur- and Spessartstraße am Uhrtürmchen and the intersection with the Saalburgstraße is the subway station Bornheim Mitte, the most important public transport node in the district. Here is the Berger street pedestrian zone, market square and district center. On the crossing Saalburgstraße the trams of the route 12 and several city busses run.

At "Bornheimer Fünffingerplätzchen" the route leaves Berger Straße. It then crosses the Rendeler Straße, Gronauer Straße, the street "Alt-Bornheim", Turmstraße and swings under the street "Am Rötheneck" into the Seckbacher Landstraße. After about 200 meters, the subway station Seckbacher Landstraße follows. On June 15, 2008, the U4 was extended over existing tracks of the depot East to the station Schäfflestraße, where there was connection to the U7. The operation on the 2 km long route was initially intended only for a half-year trial and cost about 400,000 euros. Since December 14, 2008, every second to third journey on the U4 to Enkheim has been extended to the final stop on the C line, so that parallel operation with the U7 takes place on the Schäfflestraße-Enkheim section.

U5

The U5 is a service on the Frankfurt U-Bahn. At the time of the services's inauguration in 1974, it ran from the central railway station to the Konstablerwache and then continued along the Eckenheimer Landstrasse all the way up to Preungesheim. After Konstablerwache the line is running above the ground towards Preungesheim. Until 2016 PTB cars were used as there were street level stations. In late 2016 two stations were retrofitted with high-level platforms, and the other two closed, letting the high floor U5 class operate.

The route of the U5 from the Konstablerwache to Preungesheim belonged for a long time to the well-known curiosa of the Frankfurt subway. In the course of Eckenheimer Landstraße, this line is run on about 1200 meters in length as a streetcar tram that had to share its driveway with car traffic. What was only intended as a provisional step-by-step transition from tramway to subway operation existed for more than 30 years until the construction of the urban railway from summer 2013 to October 2016.

The U5 tunnel branches off the U4 route at the three-track Konstablerwache underground station and heads north along Konrad-Adenauer-Straße to the Friedberger Tor. It ends a few meters further in an approximately 160-meter long tunnel ramp in the middle of the park of the Eschenheimer plant. The Wallanlagen are actually protected by the Wallservitut of 1827 from any development, so the route is a violation of this most famous Frankfurt building regulations dar.

As part of the expansion of the U5 stations were 80 centimeters high platforms, traffic light secured overpasses, ramps, tactile guide elements of the transitions to the platforms and the entrances. In addition to the dismantling of the existing platforms, the renovation work included the construction of the new side platforms and adjustments to the tracks and overhead lines. In addition, there will be adjustments to the road and traffic management, the cycle paths and green strips, as well as the traffic lights, which will give priority to urban railways after the completion of all stations along the route.

Thus, the use of the new subway cars of the type "U5" and a barrier-free entry and exit in the subways without height difference was possible. The length of the new stations is 78 meters and thus provides space for the use of three-car trains, which is pending extension of the light rail line in the European quarter. The stops New Jewish Cemetery and Eckenheimer Landstraße / Marbachweg were taken out of service on 9 October with the recommissioning of the service with the new U5 cars as a result of the conversion of the platforms in the lower Eckenheimer highway.

History of U5
The tram-like guidance of the U5 ends at the confluence of the Oeder Weg, where the Eckenheimer Landstraße expands to about 34 meters street width and the train receives a tram-like guidance on its own track body in the middle position. The following stop at the new building of the German National Library, which was opened in 1997, therefore has its own side platforms, as in the middle of the street south of the junction with the Alleenring, which is why it was originally called Adickes- / Nibelungenallee.

Just north of the avenue ring, the Eckenheimer Landstraße loses its inner-city character. On the western side of the street are now row buildings of the 1950s, on the eastern side of the Frankfurt main cemetery. In front of its main portal is the next stop (main cemetery). Not far behind the station Hauptfriedhof was the breakpoint Neuer Jüdischer Friedhof. This breakpoint was analogous to Musterschule and Glauburgstraße street level and without its own platform. This stop was initially called Versorgungsamt (until 2009), for the 2010 timetable Prieststraße, for the timetable year 2011 Prieststraße / Neuer Jüdischer Friedhof and since the timetable year 2012 Neuer Jüdischer Friedhof. On 9 October 2016, when the U5 started operating again with new U5 vehicles, this stop was taken out of service. It is planned to build this station at the earliest 2018 also with elevated platforms. Shortly after this stop, before the intersection with the Marbachweg, the next stop was Marbachweg / Eckenheimer Landstraße, which went out of operation at the same time and, due to its proximity to the Marbachweg / Sozialzentrum station, is no longer needed.

The U5 now follows the Marbachweg east to Gießener Straße and turns north into this, at the intersection is the station Giessener Straße, which is located about 600 meters from the previous one and thus again common design criteria in the light rail follows. The station Gießener road was from 1974 to 1978, the northern terminus of the then designated B1 service.

The new line in western side position of the Gießener Straße replaced in 1978 one of the already mentioned route 13 traveled, guided by the parallel Homburger highway, tram route. Unlike this, today's route no longer opens directly to the center of Preungesheim, but a residential area characterized by row buildings of the 1950s. At the station Sigmund-Freud-Straße are residential skyscrapers of the 1960s.

The three-track terminus Preungesheim (a central platform, a side platform) is located at the junction of Gießener road in the Homburger highway, just south of the motorway bridge of the A661.

Intersection
At the intersection, Eckenheimer Landstraße - Glauburgstraße branches off an operating route to the east. It is the remainder of the former route Eschenheimer Tor - Oeder way - Glauburgstrasse - Nordend, which was used until 1963 by the route 12, one of the main services of the Frankfurt tram network. With the beginning of the underground construction work, the route was shut down by the Oeder way and the tram service 12 moved into the Friedberger highway. The remaining stretch of the route from Eckenheimer Landstrasse to Friedberger Landstraße served as the main access road for all lines in the Eckenheim depot except the 13 and the 22, which were fed via the Marbachweg. In the rush hour this route was additionally used until the 1980s by the tram line 25 (formerly 5). It operated from Eckenheim on the Glauburgstraße to Bornheim and on to Fechenheim. Today, the route is for operational purposes only. After expanding the course towards the city center in 2002, it is only passable from and to the north. The route leads east to the intersection Friedberger Landstraße / Rohrbachstraße, where it joined in both directions to the route of the tram service 12. In the course of the expansion of the new tram service 18 to Preungesheim in 2010, the direct connection Eckenheim–Bornheim was capped and the route closes in the intersection Friedberger highway / Glauburgstraße / Rohrbachstraße only in the direction of the city center.

At the crossroads Marbachweg / Eckenheimer Landstraße branches off two further distances: from here to the north a twin-track operating line leads to the former, today only as Wagenhalle used operating yard corner home. This route used to be run by the HVZ Line 5, which was later renamed 25, as well as some sections of the timetable from lines 19 and 27.

Towards the west, the single-track section of the former tram services 13 and 22 leads over the Marbachweg to the Eschersheimer Landstraße, where it connects at the Dornbusch station to the A-line, which is also at street level. This route continued from 1963 to 1978 through the Hansaallee and the Reuterweg to the Opernplatz. That too will no longer be on scheduled service today.

History

U-Bahn in Altstadt
Construction of the B line began on June 28, 1966, exactly three years after the first line. After a ceremony and a laying of the foundation stone in the underground station Miquel- / Adickesallee, where 1963 the first Rammschlag took place, the participants, including Lord Mayor Brundert, Möller Department of Transport and Minister President Zinn went to Friedberger Tor, where, accompanied by speeches, the Straßenbahnerkapelle and Freibier the ceremonial start of construction of the B stretch took place.

The northern part of the line, between Friedberger Tor and Kurt-Schumacher-Straße, was built in an open construction, the western part of the line in mining construction. Towards the Cathedral Square and the Dominican Square were built for this purpose, in January 1970 at the cathedral square with the shield tunneling started in September the breakthrough reached. The tunneling machine was turned on Dominikanerplatz and dug until February 1971, the second tunnel tube to the cathedral square. The line was the first tunnel built in mining style in Frankfurt, this design was later due to the significantly lower loads on the surface to become the rule. However, from the second construction lot (from the Römerberg to the Weißfrauenstraße, May 1970 to March 1971), the New Austrian Tunneling Method (NÖT) was used instead of the shield tunneling.

The tunnel route to be built was located in the area of the old city, which was largely destroyed in 1944, and whose reconstruction was not finally decided until the 1970s.

While large parts of the former Old Town were rebuilt in the course of the 1950s by row buildings and green courtyards in the style of the time, remained the historic nucleus of the city, the cathedral hill (then usually called Cathedral Roman area) an empty, used as a parking lot fallow land. On the east side of the Römerberg, at the site of the later reconstructed half-timbered line, two buildings were built, which were demolished again with the beginning of the subway construction. In 1963, an urban development competition was held for the construction of the Dom-Römer area, which was decided in favor of a large, modern building complex. The subject of the competition was also the design of the entrances to the planned subway station Römer underneath the grounds as well as the underground car park to be built next to it.

The building proposed in the winning design was never realized. However, it created the two extensive underground structures. Subway station and underground parking were built in an open design, which was again very controversial at this point. The excavation pit was located in the historic heart of the city; for thousands of years man-inhabited settlement soil was destroyed for archaeological research. In addition to numerous relics of historical building sculpture, which were usually spent in the Historical Museum, and partly also in the design of the underground station were integrated, was discovered during the construction of a fully preserved and filled wine cellar from the pre-war period.

After completion of the construction work in 1974, the ceiling of the underground car park formed the new course level. The concrete pillars of the underground car park were pulled out about one meter above ground level in order to be able to place the planned large building on this pillar grid later. For almost ten years, until the reconstruction of the Römerberg-Ostzeile and the construction of the Kunsthalle Schirn, the then so-called Höckerzone occupied the historic urban space between the Kaiserdom and Römerberg. The foundations of the Carolingian Royal Palace Frankfurt were conserved in the neighboring Archaeological Garden and made accessible to the public.

The subway station at Römer (today Dom/Römer) lies very low under the street level. The tunnel undercuts the foundations of some blocks nearby. The eastern exit of the station leads over a very long escalator to the outside, the passenger rolls while the whole time directly to the tower of the cathedral, which is a rather unusual way of approaching a medieval building.

The second station of the B-line was built on the Konstablerwache, a square on the shopping street Zeil, which was also used at the time of construction as the main traffic axis for motor vehicle and tram traffic. Under the Konstablerwache, similar to the Hauptwache, an underground rapid-transit railway junction was built. In addition to the metro on the B line, stations were built for the planned C line as well as for the S-Bahn tunnel. Under an underground pedestrian passage (referred to in the technocratic spirit of the time as the B-level) is first the station of the B-lines (C-level) and below this (in the D-level) the community station of C-route and S-Bahn Train. Because of the planned line branching, the station of the B-line was built in three tracks, so are available at the Konstablerwache seven underground platform tracks with a total of five platforms. An initially with planned autotunnel under the Zeil was later deleted from the planning, but there is a preliminary construction work: Today, the generous B-level in west–east direction takes the designated space for this road; originally, two separate access levels were planned north and south of it.

The construction of the tunnel north of the Konstablerwache required the demolition of numerous buildings, including an old factory. The today's Konrad Adenauer road, the connection from the Konstablerwache to the Friedberger gate, developed thus in connection with the subway construction. When excavating the excavation, at the Friedberger Tor, the foundations of the city fortification of 1333, which had been demolished in 1810, were reached, which reached up to seven meters deep into the ground. [12]

The third station of this line was at Theaterplatz (now Willy-Brandt-Platz). The lines of the A-line have been operating here since 1973, and one year later the first interchange station of the Frankfurt subway went into operation here.

In 1974, the first section of the B route opened. From the Theaterplatz to the Konstablerwache, the tunnel in the ramparts led to the surface, from where the train continued as a normal tram in the car road of Eckenheimer Landstrasse. The subway used part of the former tram route to Berkersheim. The new B1 service ended at the Gießener Straße stop. The B1 used, unlike the subways of the A-line, tram-compatible light rail vehicles of the type Pt (t = tunneling). These were 30 cm narrower compared to the type U2 used on the A-line and at that time had novel swivel stages on the doors, so that they could also be used on tram routes without adapting the tracks. Since initially only these cars in the tunnel reversed, the platforms were widened with a bolted angle.

Hauptbahnhof Extension
The tunnel of the B-line was extended in 1978 by a station: For the tenth anniversary of the Frankfurt subway their network finally reached the central railway station. From the Theaterplatz, the new tunnel ran along the Gutleutstrasse a little to the west, until it turned off from Elbestraße under Gründerzeit blocks and then turned north to finally reach the main train station.

The underground station at the central railway station was built in four tracks. According to the traffic planning of the city should cross here two subway lines: the basic route B, coming from the old town and in the direction of Galluswarte and Höchst continuing, and the basic route D, which should lead from Schwanheim and Niederrad in the direction of Messe and Bockenheim.

As at the Hauptwache and Konstablerwache, an extensive rapid-transit railway node deep underground was built at the central railway station. Under the carriageway of the station forecourt, over which numerous tram routes and the federal highway 44 lead, was initially created here again a very large underground shopping arcade (B-level). In the third level of the four-track subway station, as the station forecourt in north–south orientation, and in the fourth level across the four-track S-Bahn station, which is located largely under the station building of the central railway station. In the gable northwest of the two underground high-speed stations, a three-storey underground car park was built. These facilities were again built in an open pit, for many years was instead of Bahnhofsplatzes a deep hole, the traffic was diverted, the northern part of the historic station building, similar to the previously baroque main guard, removed, stored and rebuilt after completion of construction.

The station forecourt was closed to the opening of the rapid-transit railway node for pedestrians - the access from the station to the city and to the tram took place for many years through the confusing B-level, the advantage of the head station, the ground-level accessibility of the trains was lost.

With reaching the central railway station the rapid-transit railway net in the city 1978 was largely completed. The basic routes A and B were in operation, the first tunnel section of the S-Bahn (to the Hauptwache) opened in the same year at the central railway station (D), the Hauptwache (C) and the Konstablerwache (C, S) were platforms for future planned lines were built as an advance with and waited their use. The first construction phase of the network, characterized by the primacy of a technocratic traffic planning (public transport and pedestrian traffic into the underground), which ultimately served the interests of automobile traffic, and a substantial renunciation of aesthetic design was completed.

Double storey by the Berger Straße
The two years later commissioned route from the Konstablerwache to Bornheim already belongs to a second construction phase. The four new underground stations, Merianplatz, Höhenstraße, Bornheim-Mitte and Seckbacher Landstraße, are simply designed. All four carry ceramic wall tiles in warm, bold colors.

The route leads along the Berger road through the inner city districts Nordend and Bornheim. Due to the small width of the Berger road, the two tunnels were not built side by side, but one above the other, so the former stations each have two single-track, superimposed platforms.

The Bornheim subway went into operation in 1980. A new service with the designation U4 drove them and also took over the existing tunnel to the central railway station. The U5 was withdrawn to the Konstablerwache, because at that time there were no vehicles of the type Ptb (b = wide) with the necessary widening in the door area. It ended now on the third track of the local station and had no contact with the U4 in the line operation. The inner-city platforms were adapted to the wider U3 subway vehicles by removing the attached widening. The new service now ran completely underground over eight stations and was considered the first "real" subway in the city.

The shortening of the U5 to Konstablerwache

The population reacted already in 1979 with protests on the planned shortening of the U5. Although the Frankfurt transport politicians had approved the plans of the municipal utilities, most of them were not aware of the consequences that the use of U3 cars on the B route would entail. In the following years countless solutions were discussed, which should allow a joint operation of U4 and U5. Although the Transport Committee of the City Parliament had already recognized the problem in 1977, a change in the already ordered U3 cars was rejected by the Stadtwerke on the grounds that the cars were already under construction. It turned out later that this did not correspond to the facts and a change of construction would have been quite possible. The Stadtwerke attempted in this way to prevent a mixed operation of the delay-prone U5 with U4 operated to metro standards. This fact was even in the news magazine Der Spiegel its nationwide echo.

After the U3 cars were delivered in the originally planned form, several solutions were discussed controversially. The main problem was the gap of about 20 cm between the vehicle and the platform resulting from the use of Pt wagons, since the widenings for the use of the U3 wagons, which were previously attached to the platform edges, had to be removed. Although this was legally permissible, but represented a high accident risk.

The attachment of narrower platform extensions to allow passage of U3 cars was not pursued after a test drive as a U3 car stuck to the bolted metal profiles. The press responded with the mocking news that they had procured for the U4 "cars that were too wide" that "did not fit in the tunnels".

As a result, the construction of four-rail tracks in the stations was considered, Pt-cars should be able to drive closer to the edge of the platform than U3 cars. However, this was not implemented due to the required complex signal protection and track systems. One of the most exotic proposals was the idea of variable platform edges - depending on the type of vehicle, the edge of the platform should be moved by extendable metal profiles. Due to the high costs, the enormous technical effort and the risk that a train of the U4 could be torn open laterally by a platform edge blocked in the extended position, this project was also filed.

Since no technical solution was apparent, with both vehicle types could be used together, it was discussed that the still brand new U3 cars, if necessary, to sell below value again and instead to procure more Pt-cars for use on the U4. Since there was no prospect for the specially built according to Frankfurt criteria vehicles, this proposal was dropped quickly. A use of the U3 cars on the A route was not possible anyway because of the lower platforms there, the C route was at that time still in an early construction phase.

A broadening of the Pt-cars was not yet possible in 1980, since the former tram line in Eckenheimer Landstraße at that time had not yet been rebuilt for the use of 2.65 m wide vehicles. Only in the course of the next years appropriate adjustments were made here. Since there was no practical solution to the problem and the planned opening date of the U4 was approaching, the previous planning was implemented unchanged. The U5 ended in the aftermath at the station Konstablerwache. Only in 1998 was it possible to find a solution for the joint operation of both types of vehicles by converting Pt cars to Ptb cars, which were widened on both sides by 11.5 cm each in the door area. The U5, U6 and U7 had taken through the Ptb train cars.

Other works
Only a few changes have been made to the subway's B line since it opened. The subway station Dom / Römer was rebuilt in the 1990s and received a rotunda in the access level. In the central railway station of the central railway station, the 30-year-old, wall-hung photographs from Frankfurt were replaced by new pictures.

The barrier-free expansion of the main line began on 23 January 2015 at the stations Bockenheimer Warte and Festhalle / Messe. While at the fair, analogous to the C-track, the tracks were raised by gravel, has been removed at the U4 terminus the provisional raised in 2002 platform again. By the end of March, the tracks were also cut open at all other stations along the U4. Since mid-April, the new U5 series has also been used on the U4. To this end, all the old cars of the type U3, which previously drove exclusively on the U4, were exchanged for new U5 cars from the U6. traffIQ and VGF have worked out the concept with the Disability Commissioner and the Frankfurt Disabled Workers' Association (FBAG), as the U4 is used by more people than the U6.

Wheelchair accessibility in the north
As resistance to the planned construction of barrier-free elevated platforms increased along the above-ground section in the Northrend, an opinion was commissioned in 2007 to investigate whether the route from Preungesheim to Konstablerwache was integrated into the tram network at the initiative of the black-green city government could be. Nevertheless, the tunneling station would nevertheless have been provided as an end point, as a result of which the line shortening of 1980 along with the associated operational problems (single-lane terminal) would have been repeated in practice. The U5 should instead be extended from the Konstablerwache on the route of the U4 on the Seckbacher country road and the depot East, then on the route of the U7 to Schäfflestraße. Meanwhile, the U4 is already going there. In 2008, the report was extended to include a plan case for a second line from Preungesheim via Glauburgstraße, Friedberger Landstraße, Konstablerwache (above ground) and the old town section to the central railway station.

A citizens' initiative had presented in October 2008, new plans for through stations based on the Stuttgart model, which should enable barrier-free operation with high-floor wagons and mid-platform platforms at the stations Musterschule and Glauburgstraße. At the stops north of Glauburgstraße there would be enough space for conventional elevated platforms. This new proposal was passed to the City of Frankfurt for approval by decision of the Frankfurt Transport Committee on 28 October 2008.

The results of both appraisals (tram and through stations) were presented together and served as the basis for a final decision on the future of the U5. [20] [21] The investigation of the tram solution showed that from an overall transport planning point of view only the light rail solution is worthy of prosecution. The integration into the tram network would lead to a weakening of public transport and an increase in motor vehicle traffic. In addition, the tram solution raises considerable questions regarding operational feasibility.

The new proposal of the city, neither mid-high platforms nor Troglösungen to build, but instead at the two stops Musterschule and Glauburgstraße two staggered, each 72 meters long and up to 80 cm high Seitenbahnsteige to meet, met with varying degrees of resonance. While the supporters of an underground railway operating in the city center greeted the concept, resistance was provoked in the affected district of Nordend.

In the Frankfurt city council meeting of July 1, 2010, the proposal, which was once again optimized in the spring of 2010, found broad support in the parliamentary groups of the CDU, SPD, FDP, Greens, and Republicans against leftists, the FAG, the Free Voters, and the NPD. After necessary sewer construction work in 2012, the first five stations between Sigmund-Freud-Straße and Marbachweg / Sozialzentrum were built in 2013. The stations Main Cemetery and German National Library were equipped in 2014 with 80 cm high elevated platforms. The rebuilding of the station Preungesheim took place from July to November 2015 and takes up the pre-planning for the extension to the Frankfurt mountain by the positions of side and middle platform were exchanged compared to the original condition. Original plans provided for 2013, the station Preungesheim initially provisionally for about €560,000 to increase, then in time before the commissioning of the extension to the European district (then planned for 2019) completely demolished and build again. These plans were revised in the short term during the course of 2013. The stops Glauburgstraße and Musterschule have been rebuilt since March 29, 2016. With the on 9 October carried out re-commissioning of the line and the station Musterschule eliminates the stop Eckenheimer Landstraße / Marbachweg permanently and the stop New Jewish Cemetery until its conversion, which will take place from 2018. The opening of the station Glauburgstraße shifted to October 29 due to disruptions in the construction process.

Opening dates

Expansion

Station rehabilitation
The aboveground section of the U5 receives instead of the recent Tiefbahnsteige barrier-free Hochbahnsteige. So far, the conversion or new construction of the stations Sigmund-Freud-Straße, Ronneburgstraße, Theobald-Ziegler-Straße, Gießener Straße and Marbachweg / Social Center (2013), Dt. National Library and Main Cemetery (2014) and the current terminus Preungesheim including track apron. Also in 2015, the burial of underground stations from the Konstablerwache to the central railway station, which are served together with the U4.

In a final construction phase, the stations Musterschule, Glauburgstraße were rebuilt from March 29 to October 29, 2016. In November 2015, following numerous appeals by residents, the planning approval decision was issued.

Since the rebuilding of the stations Musterschule and Glauburgstraße, they can no longer be served by Ptb cars, because the new platforms in subareas are only 60 cm high above the rail and the step in the Ptb cars would be too high. Therefore, since the reopening of these stations in October 2016, only the new U5 light rail vehicles will be used. In return, since then, the not equipped with elevated platforms Eckenheimer Landstraße / Marbachweg permanently and New Jewish cemetery are not served until further notice.

The stop Eckenheimer Landstraße / Marbachweg in the immediate vicinity of the Marbachweg / Sozialzentrum station was closed due to the short distance of about 70 meters. The originally planned for 2015 new construction of the station New Jewish Cemetery is now from 2018.

With the completion of the last elevated platforms along the U5 in October 2016, the new U5 urban railways could also be used here, as they do not have fold-out steps, in contrast to the previously used Ptb vehicles. Thus, on October 9, 2016, from one day to the other all Ptb cars were replaced by U5 cars that previously operated on the U6.

Europaviertel
In order to connect the Europaviertel on the site of the former main freight station, the U5 will be extended to Europaviertel West. In the past, there was a lot of discussion as to whether this should be done on the boulevard as an overground tram or light rail or as an underground route - at least in part. The branch to be served by the U5 would branch off from the U4 at the central railway station and via the intermediate stations with the working titles "Güterplatz", "Emser Brücke" and "Europagarten" along the Europa-Allee to the station "Wohnpark". The city council decided in its meeting on 24 February 2011, the construction of the route extension. The construction work should begin in 2012. For cost reasons, now deviating from the previous planning, a largely aboveground route will take place. The new plans are to lead the line to the surface in front of the station "Emser Brücke". These and all other stations will be built above ground in the middle of Europa-Allee. In the area of the Europa Garden the railway runs in a tunnel tube between two tunnels for traffic. This was decided by the City Council on March 1, 2012.

On May 3, 2013, the city council of Frankfurt am Main decided on the construction and financing proposal for the extension of the "B route" to the Europaviertel. Traffic deputy Stefan Majer described the municipal resolution as a "milestone for the city district and as a clear sign of the high priority for investment in the sustainable development of our urban transport service". The new building for the extension of the light rail line is to connect to the existing route at the Platz der Republik, run over the "Güterplatz" station for 1.4 kilometers underground and to the surface in front of the "Emser Brücke" station via a ramp in the middle of the Europaboulevards bump. The station "Emser bridge" should lie in the 1.3 kilometer long aboveground part, which runs on the boulevard over the station "Europagarten" up to the last stop "Wohnpark". Between the stations "Europagarten" and "Wohnpark" the route is to be tunneled under again: Together with the car traffic the course is to cross the Europagarten. On the boulevard, the light rail in a bilateral, tree-lined, unfenced median strip should largely ride on a grass track. According to City Councilor Stefan Majer "for the development of the European quarter with its future about 32,000 jobs and housing for 3,800 people this direct and efficient link with the light rail line is crucial." So far, only the outskirts of the district with the underground service U4 and the tram routes 16 and 17 are connected to the north or northeastern edge. The connection in the middle of the district into successes so far only on the bus route 46, which could no longer serve the rising numbers of passengers with expansion of the district. The underground connection with the U5 service over central railway station, Willy-Brandt-Platz, Konstablerwache, Nordend to Preungesheim is to offer the residents and the working population a fast and environmentally friendly alternative to the car.

The current U5 will start after completion of the route over their current terminus at the central railway station, the four new stations. According to the present plan, the costs for the line should amount to 217.3 million euros, of which the city of Frankfurt / Main bears a share of 174.8 million euros (gross) and the VGF 42.5 million euros (net) should. Both the city and the VGF had already submitted applications for funding under the GVFG (Municipal Traffic Financing Act) and the FAG (Financing Equalization Act). The VGF is also to receive funds from the demerger of around 9.5 million euros. The documents for the planning approval have already been submitted to the Regierungspräsidium Darmstadt. The planned start of construction was dependent on the plan approval decision, the VGF aimed at the summer of 2014.

As part of the planning approval process, the planned mining tunneling method was considered too risky, so that the city was forced to reschedule. Now a tunnel boring machine is to clear the way from the Warschauer Straße to the Platz der Republik for the Stadtbahn. In addition, now no longer the city, but the VGF builder of the light rail extension to be. Despite yet another increase in costs, the cost-benefit factor should still be 1.6. The regional council in Darmstadt issued the plan approval decision on 19 May 2016.

Meanwhile, construction has already begun in the west. The Europaallee has been prepared from the Römerhof to the western tunnel portal since the end of 2014, the central part of the Europaallee to the Emser bridge since November 2015, so that only tracks have to be laid and the platforms have to be built. The adjoining tunnel under the Europa Garden has been under construction since spring 2015 and was completed in June 2016 in the shell. In February 2016, construction work began on the construction of the ramp from the Madrid to Warschauer Straße and the subsequent tunnel from there to the continuity of the Republic Square. As early as 2014, all lines were laid between Den Haager Strasse and Güterplatz to clear the construction site for the only underground station Güterplatz. The symbolic groundbreaking ceremony for the extension of the U5 took place on 21 September 2017, with the concreting of the first diaphragm wall lamella began in early October 2017. Completion of the work is now scheduled for 2022.

Frankfurter Berg
The U5 is to be extended from its current terminus in Preungesheim to the Frankfurt mountain. At the new terminus, a direct transition to the S-Bahn station Frankfurter Berg on the S6 service is planned. The route should run on its own route along the Homburger highway. In addition to the reconstruction of the station Preungesheim and the new terminus Frankfurter Berg two more stations in the amount August-Schanz-Straße and Berkersheimer Weg are planned. On the Jean Monnet Road, the route is to change from the west to the east side of the Homburger Landstraße.

In February 2012, the Frankfurt Budget Commission proposed to waive the extension of the U5 to the north for financial reasons. In April 2012, however, it became known that the route should still be built. In order to finance the urban share of 4.4 million euros in the expansion costs, two other projects (a cycle path and the extension of Hansaallee) were canceled.

In a new Volte the northern extension was again shifted to the Frankfurt mountain. This time moved to 2017 or later. The new construction of the station Preungesheim planned as part of this extension was already realized, because the extension in both the north and in the west direction not only high but also longer platforms are required to three-car trains of the type U5 to drive.

From July to November 2015, the track apron and station Preungesheim was rebuilt and positioned the new barrier-free elevated platforms with a height of 80 cm so that in an extension to the Frankfurt mountain only the bumpers on the tracks 1 and 2 have to be removed to the new line to join. Track 3 is reserved for trains that will end in Preungesheim in the future.

In September 2017, the city council of Frankfurt decided to provide funds to allow the extension to Frankfurt by 2022.

Bergen
At the end of the connecting stretch to Bornheim, an underground extension of the U4 via Seckbach to Bergen is originally planned. This subway line is part of the incorporation agreement between Frankfurt and the former city of Bergen-Enkheim, which came into force in 1978. Due to the low projected cost-benefit factor and the resulting poor prospects for federal and state funding, implementation is unlikely. Better chances, however, has a short extension to a station to the settlement Atzelberg in Seckbach. The turning facility on the Seckbacher Landstraße is already prepared for this.

References

Frankfurt U-Bahn